CBS Justice (formerly CBS Action) was a British free-to-air television channel specialising in action film, drama and murder-mysteries programs. It launched in the UK and Ireland on 16 November 2009 and later expanded to Africa in 2019.  It closed on all platforms in the UK on 30 June 2022.

History
On 14 September 2009, it was revealed that the international arm of CBS, CBS Studios International, struck a joint venture deal with Chellomedia to launch six CBS-branded channels in the UK during 2009. The new channels would replace Zone Romantica, Zone Thriller, Zone Horror and Zone Reality, plus timeshift services Zone Horror +1 and Zone Reality +1. On 1 October 2009, it was announced that CBS Reality, CBS Reality +1, CBS Drama and CBS Action would launch on 16 November 2009 replacing Zone Reality, Zone Reality +1, Zone Romantica and Zone Thriller. On 5 April 2010, Zone Horror and Zone Horror +1 were rebranded as Horror Channel and Horror Channel +1, following the rebrand of the portfolio's other three channels in November 2009.

CBS Reality launched on Freeview on 1 April 2014, and as of July 2014, CBS Reality +1, CBS Action, CBS Drama & Horror Channel are available on the YouView platform as part of TalkTalk TV's Entertainment Boost. A placeholder launched on Freeview and YouView on 29 August 2014 for CBS Action on channel 90, in addition to the channel being provided on the YouView TalkTalk platform. The channel started broadcasting on channel 70 on 1 October 2014. Then on 19 February 2015, CBS Action moved from channel 70 to channel 64 on Freeview. On 2 June 2015, it was removed from YouView channel 485. On 15 March 2017, a timeshift version of CBS Action launched on Freeview channel 90. It was affected by the Freeview changes on 2 August 2017, moving to channel 64 and CBS Action to 39. The timeshift version of CBS Action ceased broadcasting on Freeview on 31 January 2018, and was removed from the EPG on 23 April 2018. It returned on 7 January 2020 on DVB-T2 devices as CBS Justice +1 on channel 69, but closed again on 22 June 2020 to make room for COM7 following the closure of COM8.

On 5 December 2018 CBS Action rebranded as CBS Justice.

On 21 November 2019, CBS Justice launched a local version across Africa available on DStv.

On 4 November 2020, the channel moved to channel 40 on Freeview as part of a move up where every channel from channel 24 to 54 on the platform moved up one place to allow BBC Four to move to channel 24 in Scotland due to new Ofcom rules regarding certain PSB channels requiring greater prominence on EPGs.                 

On 18 June 2022, it was announced that CBS Justice would be closed down on all platforms, with its slot on a number of satellite and cable platforms to be taken by Legend, the replacement for Horror Channel, on 30 June 2022, following the decision by AMC to drop the CBS branding from their channels owned in a joint-venture with Paramount Global.

Final programming (UK version)
Bonanza
The High Chaparral
CSI: Miami
CSI: NY
Diagnosis: Murder
Father Dowling Mysteries
JAG
MacGyver
Matlock
Mission: Impossible
NCIS
NCIS: Los Angeles
Walker, Texas Ranger

Former programming (UK version)

The 4400 (now airing on Horror Channel)
18 Wheels of Justice
The A-Team (now on Paramount Network)
Bad Girls (now on CBS Drama)
Cops (now airing on TruTV)
CSI: Crime Scene Investigation
Profit
Queen of Swords (aspect ratio pan and scan version from 16:9 aspect ratio)
Adventure Inc. (aspect ratio pan and scan version from 16:9 aspect ratio)
F/X: The Series
Gunsmoke (seasons 7-18)  (now on CBS Drama)
Hawaii Five-O
In Deep
Jake 2.0
Knight Rider (now on Paramount Network) 
La Femme Nikita
Mission: Impossible (1988 TV series)
Remington Steele 
Space Precinct (now on ITV4)
Star Trek: The Original Series (now on Horror Channel) 
Star Trek: Voyager (now on Horror Channel)
Wonder Woman (TV series) (now on Horror Channel)
The Fugitive 
The Pretender
The Sentinel
Suspicious Agenda
To Serve and Protect
Jake and the Fatman
The Twilight Zone (1985 TV series)
Thunder in Paradise
Ultimate Force

See also
CBS Reality
CBS Drama
CBS Europa
Paramount International Networks
AMC Networks International
Rock Action
Rock Entertainment

References

External links
CBS Justice

AMC Networks International
Paramount International Networks
Television channels and stations established in 2009
Television channels and stations disestablished in 2022
English-language television stations in the United Kingdom
Television stations in Africa
2009 establishments in the United Kingdom
2019 establishments in Africa
2022 disestablishments in the United Kingdom